The canton of Sevi-Sorru-Cinarca is an administrative division of the Corse-du-Sud department, southeastern France. It was created at the French canton reorganisation which came into effect in March 2015. Its seat is in Cargèse.

It consists of the following communes:

Ambiegna 
Arbori 
Arro 
Azzana 
Balogna 
Calcatoggio 
Cannelle 
Cargèse 
Casaglione 
Coggia 
Cristinacce 
Évisa 
Guagno 
Letia 
Lopigna 
Marignana
Murzo 
Orto 
Osani 
Ota 
Partinello 
Pastricciola 
Piana 
Poggiolo 
Renno 
Rezza 
Rosazia 
Salice 
Sant'Andréa-d'Orcino 
Sari-d'Orcino 
Serriera 
Soccia 
Vico

References

Cantons of Corse-du-Sud